English independence is a political stance advocating secession of England from the United Kingdom. Support for secession of England (the UK's largest and most populated country) has been influenced by the increasing devolution of political powers to Scotland, Wales and Northern Ireland, where independence from the United Kingdom (and in the case of Northern Ireland, reunification with the rest of Ireland) is a prominent subject of political debate.

English independence has been seen by its advocates as a way to resolve the West Lothian question in British politics: Scottish, Welsh and Northern Irish MPs in the Parliament of the United Kingdom at Westminster being able to vote on matters affecting England, but English MPs not having the same power over equivalent issues in Scotland, Wales and Northern Ireland, as these powers are devolved to the Scottish Parliament, the Northern Ireland Assembly or the Senedd (Welsh Parliament).

While some minor political parties have campaigned for English independence, all major UK-wide political parties adhere to the conventional view of British unionism, and oppose changing the constitutional status of England. Scottish demands for independence, rather than English demands, are seen as the most pressing threat to British unity; Scotland voted against independence at the referendum on 18 September 2014, but the topic is still being debated. The membership of Northern Ireland in the UK is an equally controversial topic, whilst Welsh independence has also grown in support in recent years.

Historical context

Kingdom of England 
The English national identity developed over a long period of time. In the wake of the breakdown of Roman rule in Britain from the middle of the fourth century, present day England was progressively settled by Germanic groups. Collectively known as Anglo-Saxons, these were Angles and Saxons from what is now the Danish/German border area and Jutes from the Jutland peninsula. The Kingdom of England came into being in the 10th century: it spanned much of the southern two-thirds of Great Britain and a number of smaller outlying islands. The Norman conquest of Wales from 1067 to 1283 (formalised by the Statute of Rhuddlan in 1284) placed Wales under English control, and Wales came under English law with the Laws in Wales Acts 1535–1542, which disestablished the Principality of Wales.

Formation of the UK 
In 1603, the Union of the Crowns took place when the death of Elizabeth I resulted in James VI, King of Scots, acceding to the English throne, placing England and Scotland under personal union. In 1707, the Acts of Union were passed by both the Parliament of England and the Parliament of Scotland, forming the Kingdom of Great Britain. The measure was deeply unpopular in both Scotland and England. The Scottish signatories to the Act were forced to sign the documents in secrecy because of mass rioting and unrest in the Scottish capital, Edinburgh. Scotland did however retain Scots law, a legal system distinct from that used in England and Wales.

In 1800, the Kingdom of Great Britain and the Kingdom of Ireland both passed new Acts of Union, creating the United Kingdom of Great Britain and Ireland, which came into being in 1801. In 1921, the Anglo-Irish Treaty was agreed, allowing Southern Ireland under the Irish Free State to become a Dominion, resulting in only Northern Ireland remaining within the UK, which in 1927 was formally renamed the United Kingdom of Great Britain and Northern Ireland.

English independence movement

Parliament motion 
In 2006 a motion was tabled in the UK parliament advocating for English independence, signed by four Members: Peter Atkinson of the Conservative Party, Angus MacNeil of the Scottish National Party and Bill Etherington and Elliot Morley of Labour. Mike Wood, then Labour MP for Batley and Spen, withdrew his support. The signatories cited an ICM poll showing a majority in England (as well as Scotland) for English independence.

English identity 
The 2021 census found that only 15.3% of people living in England declared themselves as "English", a significant decrease from 60.4% in 2011. 56.8% declared themselves as "British" only in 2021. 14.3% declared themselves as "English and British", an increase from 9.1% in 2011.

English independence support 
In 2015, following the Scottish independence referendum, journalist Leo McKinstry proposed a referendum on English independence, also stating that English patriotism is as valid as Scottish patriotism and that the people of England have as much a right as Scottish people to hold a referendum on English independence.

In 2017, over 4,000 people signed a petition supporting independence for England.

In 2020, a poll by Panelbase showed that 49% of English voters supported English independence, excluding "don't knows". 34% were in favour of English independence, 36% against and 30% didn't know.

In August 2022, the English Constitution Party announced an independence rally in York. "We advocate for the voiding, not repeal but the voiding, of the Act of Union," Moore told The National. "That means that Scotland has complete control over its own nation, and England, we advocate, has an English parliament."

Arguments for English independence

Economy 
There are questions over the currency of an independent England and whether it would use the Pound sterling. Uncertainty could be brought in the immediate aftermath of independence and the unlikelihood of the Bank of England accepting a currency union with an independent England. Advocates of English sovereignty claim that a sovereign England would enjoy one of the world's strongest economies, with an estimated GDP of US$2.865 trillion as of 2015, making it the world's 5th, 6th, or 7th largest economy depending on measurement. It is also claimed that England would be the 15th wealthiest nation in the world, with a GDP per capita of US$33,999 in 2015. The equivalent figures are $30,783 for Scotland, $23,397 for Wales, and $24,154 for Northern Ireland, or $27,659 for the UK minus England.

Education 
Along with London, one of the leading major world cities and the world's second largest most historically significant financial centres, as its capital, England would continue to possess an enviable education system that includes some of the world's most prestigious universities, with the University of Oxford, the University of Cambridge and colleges of the University of London regularly featuring among the top 10 of the QS World University Rankings.

Supporters of English independence
Political parties
 The Green Party of England and Wales supports Welsh independence, the Scottish Greens support Scottish independence and Green Party Northern Ireland support Irish re-unification if the majority of people in Northern Ireland do so.
 English Democrats
 Mebyon Kernow supports Cornish devolution
 The Northern Independence Party supports Northern independence

Opinion polls
The English nationalist movement has its roots in a historical legacy which predates the United Kingdom. The rise in English identity in recent years, as evidenced by the increased display of the English flag (particularly during international sporting competitions and in relation to their football team), is sometimes attributed in the media to the increased devolution of political power to Scotland, Wales and Northern Ireland.

One possible incentive for the establishment of self-governing English political institutions is the West Lothian question: the constitutional inconsistency whereby MPs from all four nations of the UK can vote on matters that solely affect England, while those same matters are reserved to the devolved assemblies of the other nations. (For example, the Scottish MP for West Lothian has a say on policing in the West Midlands.)

Contemporary English nationalist movements differ significantly from mainstream Scottish, Welsh and Cornish nationalist movements (whilst similar to some strands of Irish nationalism) insofar as they are often associated with support for right-of-centre economic and social policies. Nationalists elsewhere in the British Isles tend towards a social democratic political stance. English nationalism is also often associated with Euroscepticism: one reason for opposition to the European Union (EU) was the view that England was being arbitrarily subdivided into regions at the behest of the EU with limited say from the British Government.

Polling data for English devolution and independence may be found in the table below.

Organisations
A political party campaigning for English Independence was formed in February 2008, the Free England Party, it achieving some minor electoral success before disbanding in December 2009.

An English Parliament within the UK was the (3.2.2) 2016 Manifesto pledge of the English Democrats.

An English Independence party was registered in 2016. Its leader, Neil Humphrey, appeared on ballot papers as "ANTI Corbyn" in the 2016 Batley and Spen by-election.

Opposition

Political parties
 

The Conservative Party, Labour Party and Liberal Democrats, oppose English independence. Other parties that oppose(d) English independence are/were the UK Independence Party (UKIP), the British National Party (BNP), Britain First, the Britannica Party, the Scottish Unionist Party (SUP), the Respect Party, Ulster Unionist party, Democratic Unionist Party (DUP) and Ulster Unionist Party (UUP).

Unionist political parties in England
Conservative Party
Labour Party
Liberal Democrats
UK Independence Party
Reform UK

See also
 Devolved English parliament
 English Democrats
 Federalism in the United Kingdom
 Republicanism in the United Kingdom
 West Lothian question
 Potential breakup of the United Kingdom

References

Separatism in the United Kingdom
Independence movements
Politics of England
Constitution of the United Kingdom
English nationalism